Afril Ornedo Bernardino (born April 3, 1996) is a Filipino professional basketball player. She also represents the Philippine national team in international competitions.

College career
She played for the NU Lady Bulldogs, the women's team of the National University (NU), in the UAAP from Seasons 75 to 79. She has been included in the Mythical Team from Season 76-79. In 2014, she led National University to its first UAAP women's basketball championship bagging her first MVP award in Season 77. In 2015, Bernardino was named the Most Valuable Player and Finals MVP in the UAAP Season 78 women's basketball tournament. In her final year, she was named the Most Valuable player leading NU to its 3rd straight championship and also won and became champions of the inaugural UAAP women's 3x3 basketball competition. She has consumed all her playing years in UAAP by 2017 after competing at UAAP Season 79

Professional career
After college, Bernardino joined the Malaysian Women's Basketball League in 2018 and played as an import for the Valkyrie Hatchers.

National team career
She has represented the Philippines in international basketball competitions such as the 2015 FIBA Asia Women's Championship, the 2015 Southeast Asian Games, and the 2016 SEABA Championship. Team Philippines won their first-ever women's basketball championship at the 2019 Southeast Asian Games held in the Philippines. Also winning gold in the 3x3 women's basketball tourney along with Jack Animam, Janine Pontejos and Clare Castro.

Bernardino is also part of the national 3x3 team which competed for the Philippines at the 2018 FIBA 3x3 World Cup.

References

1996 births
Living people
Competitors at the 2017 Southeast Asian Games
Competitors at the 2019 Southeast Asian Games
Filipino expatriate basketball people in Malaysia
Filipino women's basketball players
People from Cainta
Philippines women's national basketball team players
Power forwards (basketball)
Small forwards
Southeast Asian Games medalists in basketball
Southeast Asian Games gold medalists for the Philippines
Southeast Asian Games competitors for the Philippines
NU Lady Bulldogs basketball players
Southeast Asian Games medalists in 3x3 basketball
Competitors at the 2021 Southeast Asian Games